Luo Bing may refer to the following people:

Luo Bing (駱冰), a fictional character in the novel The Book and the Sword
Luo Bing (athlete), a Chinese athlete